Platyptilia isocrates is a moth of the family Pterophoridae. It is found in the Kashmir region of what was British India.

References

Moths described in 1924
isocrates
Endemic fauna of India
Moths of Asia